The Battle of Hill's Point, also known as the Battle of Fort Huger, took place from April 11 to May 4, 1863, as part of the Siege of Suffolk.

Battle
On April 19, 1863, a detachment of the 8th Connecticut and the 89th New York landed on Hill's Point at the confluence of the forks of the Nansemond River. This amphibious force assaulted Fort Huger from the rear, quickly capturing its garrison, thus reopening the river to Union shipping. On April 24, Brig. Gen. Michael Corcoran's Union division mounted a reconnaissance-in-force from Fort Dix against Maj. Gen. George E. Pickett's extreme right flank. The Federals approached cautiously and were easily repulsed. On April 29, Gen. Robert E. Lee directed Longstreet to disengage from Suffolk and rejoin the Army of Northern Virginia at Fredericksburg. By May 4, the last of Longstreet's command had crossed the Blackwater River en route to Richmond.

References
 National Park Service battle description
 CWSAC Report Update

Notes

1863 in Virginia
April 1863 events
May 1863 events
Battles of the Eastern Theater of the American Civil War
Battles of Longstreet's Tidewater Campaign of the American Civil War
Conflicts in 1863
Inconclusive battles of the American Civil War
Suffolk, Virginia